Freedom School, Yes! is a 2001 children's picture book by Amy Littlesugar and illustrated by Floyd Cooper. It is about Jolie, a young girl, and her family's involvement with the 1964 Mississippi Summer Project.

Reception
The School Library Journal, in a review of Freedom School, Yes!, wrote "Littlesugar has created a slice-of-life story with a potent message. .. The illustrations are masterful and lush. .. A unique and poignant look at a moment in history."

Freedom School, Yes! has also been reviewed by Horn Book Guide Reviews, Booklist, Kirkus Reviews, and Publishers Weekly, 

It is a 2002 National Council of Teachers of English Adventuring with Books book and a 2002 Notable Social Studies Trade Book for Young People.

See also

Freedom Summer (book)

References

External links
Library holdings of Freedom School, Yes!

2001 children's books
American picture books
Books about African-American history